Asia has many narrow-gauge railways. The railways of Japan (except for high-speed lines), Indonesia (except for high-speed line) and the Philippines are predominantly  narrow gauge. Those in mainland Southeast Asia, which includes Vietnam, Cambodia, Laos, Thailand, Myanmar and Malaysia, are predominantly metre gauge. The proposed ASEAN Railway would be standard or dual gauge, using metre- and standard-gauge regional railway networks and linking Singapore (at the southern tip of the Malay Peninsula) through Malaysia, Thailand, Laos and Vietnam to China's standard-gauge rail network. In Western Asia, Jordan uses  narrow gauge.

China 

Some of China's rail network is metre gauge, and many narrow-gauge railways existed in the country. Metre-gauge railways were popular in several regions before 1949. The metre-gauge Kunming-Hekou Railway (previously known as the Sino-Vietnamese Railway) was built between Vietnam and China by French colonists. In Manchuria, lumber companies built narrow-gauge railways—primarily  gauge—into the forests. The ,  Gebishi railway was built from Caoba towards Shiping. Built in 1915, its final  section was closed in 1990.

Hong Kong 

The Sha Tau Kok Railway had a  gauge for much of its existence. The Hong Kong Tramways are  gauge and the territory's metro, the MTR, runs on  except for its leased, standard-gauge KCR network.

India 

India has five narrow-gauge railways: the metre-gauge Nilgiri Mountain Railway, the  Kalka–Shimla Railway and Kangra Valley Railway and the  Darjeeling Himalayan and Matheran Hill Railways.  These Mountain railways of India are UNESCO World Heritage Sites, and avoided conversion to broad gauge under Project Unigauge.

Indonesia 

Indonesia had a number of narrow-gauge railways including KRL and supporting industry, primarily sugarcane plantations in Java. Sugarcane production has been declining, and the railways are now largely closed or used for tourism. Most of the country's active railways use the  gauge.

Japan 

Except for the high-speed Shinkansen lines and JR East's Ou Main and Tazawako Lines, all of Japan Railways Group's network is narrow-gauge . Some companies, such as Kintetsu, Keisei Electric Railway, Keihin Electric Express Railway, Hankyu Railway, Toei Asakusa Line, Tokyo Metro's Ginza Line and Marunouchi line, use standard gauge.

Tokyo's Keio Corporation network and the Toei Shinjuku subway line, which have through service, use an unusual  gauge. This gauge is also used on the Tokyo and Hakodate tramways.

Japan adopted  as a standard narrow gauge for small, forestry and industrial lines. Most of these narrow-gauge lines were abandoned, and only four remain in operation: the Kintetsu Utsube Line, Kintetsu Hachioji Line, Sangi Railway and Kurobe Gorge Railway.

Malaysia 

Malaysia's oldest railway systems are metre gauge, a standard which was adopted when the British colonial government laid down the first rail lines in 1885. Keretapi Tanah Melayu, the main railway operator in Peninsular Malaysia, uses metre gauge for the main west- and east-coast intercity lines and the lines spanning Singapore from the Johor-Singapore Causeway to the Tanjong Pagar railway station. Existing metre-gauge lines are also used for KTM Komuter, the country's commuter rail service, which links Kuala Lumpur and its suburbs. Standard gauge is used by the Putra LRT and Star LRT light rail operators in Kuala Lumpur and the privately-operated Express Rail Link to Kuala Lumpur International Airport.

In Sabah, the North Borneo Railway (Keretapi Negeri Sabah) runs a metre-gauge line from Kota Kinabalu to Tenom in the Crocker Range via Beaufort. Steam locomotives are also used on this route.

Philippines 

Except for the  Line 1, Line 2 and Line 3 systems in Metro Manila, the Philippine National Railways (PNR) uses a  track gauge. The PNR has one line (from Manila to the southern Luzon city of Legazpi), but only operates commuter rail service in Metro Manila. Until the 1980s, a more-extensive network ran north to San Fernando in La Union province.

A number of industrial narrow-gauge steam railways are operated by the sugarcane industry, concentrated on the islands of Negros and Panay. The Visayas region is the hub of the sugarcane lines, and some mills (such as La Carlotta Milling in Negros) run charter trains for tourists.

Abandoned lines remain on the islands of Cebu (abandoned in the 1950s or 1960s), Mindanao and Panay (closed in the 1990s). Panay Railways operated a  rail line from Roxas City and Iloilo City until the mid-1980s.

Taiwan 

Taiwan began developing its rail service during the Qing dynasty, using a  gauge. The Japanese colonial government, which ruled from 1895 to 1945, continued using that gauge. The system is now administered by the Taiwan Railway Administration, and the Taipei Metro and Kaohsiung MRT use standard gauge. The Taiwan High Speed Rail (THSR), which began operation in January 2007, also uses standard gauge. A  gauge line on the east coast was regauged to  when it was interconnected.

A , narrow-gauge Alishan Forest Railway stretches  and connects Chiayi to the mountain resort of Alishan. The line is primarily a tourist attraction. On 7 September 2006, the Taiwanese government announced a plan to update to standard gauge.

Thailand

The Northern Line was originally standard gauge, but it was regauged after 1919 and the State Railway of Thailand now operates entirely on metre gauge (including service to Malaysia and Laos). However, standard gauge is used by the BTS skytrain, the MRT and the Bangkok airport link. All proposed new high-speed lines would be standard gauge. At Siam Park City in Bangkok, a light railway for visitors operated for about two decades. The Siam Park City Railway had a 2 ft (610 mm) track gauge; remnants are still visible, and the locomotives are at the former roofed depot.

References